Notable persons that have served in the Chasseurs Alpins.

Officers
 Jacques Faure
 Maurice Gamelin
 Yves Godard
 André Lalande
 Nicolas Le Nen
 Émile Paganon
 Philippe Pétain
 Marcel Pourchier
 Bernard Saint-Hillier
 Jean Vallette d'Osia

Enlisted
 Caroline Aigle
 Ulysse Bozonnet
 Marie Marvingt
 Gilbert Morand
 George Rodocanachi
 Pierre Schoendoerffer
 Léon Weil

French Army